The 1967 Chicago Cubs season was the 96th season of the Chicago Cubs franchise, the 92nd in the National League and the 52nd at Wrigley Field. The Cubs finished third in the National League with a record of 87–74, fourteen games behind the NL and World Series Champion St. Louis Cardinals.

Offseason 
 October 18, 1966: Joey Amalfitano was released by the Cubs.
 October 18, 1966: Marty Keough was released by the Cubs.
 November 29, 1966: Chris Krug and Wayne Schurr were traded by the Cubs to the California Angels for Mike White and Don Furnald (minors).
 November 29, 1966: Hal Haydel was drafted from the Cubs by the San Francisco Giants in the 1966 minor league draft.

Regular season

Season standings

Record vs. opponents

Notable transactions 
 May 20, 1967: Joey Amalfitano was signed as a free agent by the Cubs.
 July 6, 1967: Joey Amalfitano was released by the Cubs.
 July 24, 1967: Bob Shaw was purchased by the Cubs from the New York Mets. 
 September 19, 1967: Bob Shaw was released by the Cubs.

Roster

Player stats

Batting

Starters by position 
Note: Pos = Position; G = Games played; AB = At bats; H = Hits; Avg. = Batting average; HR = Home runs; RBI = Runs batted in

Other batters 
Note: G = Games played; AB = At bats; H = Hits; Avg. = Batting average; HR = Home runs; RBI = Runs batted in

Pitching

Starting pitchers 
Note: G = Games pitched; IP = Innings pitched; W = Wins; L = Losses; ERA = Earned run average; SO = Strikeouts

Other pitchers 
Note: G = Games pitched; IP = Innings pitched; W = Wins; L = Losses; ERA = Earned run average; SO = Strikeouts

Relief pitchers 
Note: G = Games pitched; W = Wins; L = Losses; SV = Saves; ERA = Earned run average; SO = Strikeouts

Farm system 

Duluth-Superior affiliation shared with Chicago White Sox

References

External links
1967 Chicago Cubs season at Baseball Reference

Chicago Cubs seasons
Chicago Cubs season
Chicago Cubs